The League of Legends World Championship (commonly abbreviated as Worlds''') is the annual professional League of Legends world championship tournament hosted by Riot Games and is the culmination of each season. Teams compete for the champion title, the 70-pound (32-kilogram) Summoner's Cup, and a multi-million-dollar championship prize. In 2018, the final was watched by 99.6 million people, breaking 2017's final's viewer record. The tournament has been praised for its ceremonial performances, while receiving attention worldwide due to its dramatic and emotional nature.

The League of Legends World Championships has gained tremendous success and popularity, making it among the world's most prestigious and watched tournaments, as well as the most watched video game in the world.

The tournament rotates its venues across different major countries and regions each year. South Korea's T1 is the most successful team in the tournament's history, having won three world championships.

 History 
 Season 1 (2011) 
The Season 1 Championship was held in June 2011 at Dreamhack Summer 2011, and featured a US$100,000 tournament prize pool. 8 teams from Europe, North America, Southeast Asia participated in the championship. Over 1.6 million viewers watched the streaming broadcast of the event, with a peak of over 210,069 simultaneous viewers in the final. Maciej "Shushei" Ratuszniak of the winning team Fnatic was named the most valuable player (MVP) of the tournament.

 Season 2 (2012) 

After Season 1, Riot announced that 5,000,000 would be paid out over Season 2. Of this $5 million, $2 million went to Riot's partners including the IGN Pro League and other major esports associations. Another $2 million went to Riot's Season 2 qualifiers and championship. The final $1 million went to other organizers who applied to Riot to host independent League of Legends tournaments.

The Season 2 World Championship was held in early October 2012 in Los Angeles, California to conclude the 5 million season. Twelve qualifying teams from around the world participated in the championship, which boasted the largest prize pool in the history of esports tournaments at the time at 2 million, with 1 million going to the champions. The group stage, quarterfinal, and semifinal matches took place between 4 and 6 October. The grand final took place a week after, on 13 October in the University of Southern California's Galen Center in front of 10,000 fans, and were broadcast in 13 different languages. In the grand final, Taiwan's professional team Taipei Assassins triumphed over South Korea's Azubu Frost 3 to 1 and claimed the 1 million in prize money.

Over 8 million viewers tuned in to the Season 2 World Championship broadcast, with a maximum of 1.1 million concurrent viewers during the grand final, making the Season 2 World Championship the most watched esports event in history at the time.

 Season 3 (2013) 

The Season 3 World Championship was held in late 2013 in Los Angeles, California. 14 teams from North America, Korea, China, Southeast Asia, Europe, and one of the emerging League of Legends territories measured up at the World Playoffs after having qualified through their regional competitions. The grand final was held in the Staples Center on 4 October 2013, where Korean team SK Telecom T1 defeated the Chinese team Royal Club, granting them the title of the Season 3 world champions, the Summoner's Cup and the $1 million prize.

The Season 3 World Championship grand final broadcast on 4 October was watched by 32 million people with a peak concurrent viewership of 8.5 million. The numbers once again beat the previous records for esports viewership.

 2014 

The 2014 World Championship featured 16 teams competing for a $2.13 million prize pool, with 14 teams qualifying from the primary League of Legends regions (China, Europe, North America, Korea and Taiwan/SEA) and two international wildcard teams.  Riot stopped numbering seasons and instead simply used the year for the 2014 and future championships.

The group stage began 18 September in Taipei and concluded 28 September in Singapore with eight teams advancing to the bracket stage. The bracket stage started on 3 October in Busan, South Korea, and concluded on 19 October with the grand final hosted at the 45,000-seats Seoul World Cup Stadium, where South Korean team Samsung Galaxy White beat the Chinese team Star Horn Royal Club to become the 2014 League of Legends world champions. Support player Cho "Mata" Se-hyeong was named the tournament most valuable player (MVP).

American band Imagine Dragons contributed the theme song "Warriors" for the tournament, and performed live on the grand final stage in South Korea. All games were made available for free via live streaming.

The 2014 World Championship games were streamed live by 40 broadcast partners, and cast in 19 languages. The grand final was watched by 27 million people, with concurrent viewership peaking at over 11 million viewers.

 2015 

After the 2014 season, Riot Games introduced a number of changes to competitive League of Legends. The number of teams in the League Championship Series was increased from 8 to 10 in both the North America and Europe regions. A second Riot Games official international tournament was announced, the Mid-Season Invitational, which took place in May 2015, and featured a single team from each major region and one international wildcard. Additionally, starting from 2015, all teams are required to field a head coach in their competitive matches, who will stay on stage and speak with the team via voice-chat in the pick–ban phase of the game. This change makes the head coach an officially recognized member of the team.

The 2015 World Championship concluded the 2015 season, and was held at several venues across Europe in October 2015. Like the 2014 World Championship, the 2015 World Championship was a multi-city, multi-country event. 2015 Worlds was won by SK Telecom T1, their second title, as they won the 2013 Worlds too. SKT top laner Jang "MaRin" Gyeong-Hwan was named the tournament most valuable player (MVP).  The final was watched by 36 million people, with a peak concurrent viewership of 14 million viewers.

 2016 

The various stages of the 2016 Worlds were held throughout the United States in Chicago, San Francisco, New York City, and the final in Los Angeles.

The groups of teams were decided through a live group draw show on 10 September. The games were played on the 6.18 patch of the game with Yorick disabled, and Aurelion Sol disabled for days 1–3. There were 16 teams and 4 groups that consisted of 4 teams. The group stage was Bo1 and the top two teams from each groups would advance to the Knockout Stage.
The Knockout Stage was Bo5 and the #1 vs #2 teams from each group would face each other in the bracket.
The total prize pool was US$5,070,000 and it was spread among the teams. The first place (SK Telecom T1) took $2,028,000, the second team (Samsung Galaxy) took $760,500, the third place (ROX Tigers) took $380,250. The rest of the prize pool was distributed among the 5th–16th places.

SKT won 3–2 versus Samsung Galaxy in the 2016 World Championship final, with Faker winning the MVP award. The final was watched by 43 million people, with a peak concurrent viewership of 14.7 million viewers, breaking 2015's final's viewer records.

 2017 

The 2017 World Championship series started in September 2017, and concluded in November 2017.  It was held in 4 different locations throughout China: Wuhan (play-in and groups), Guangzhou (quarterfinals), Shanghai (semifinals), and Beijing (final).  It was played on patch 7.18, with the newest champion Ornn being disabled. Patch 7.18 is slightly older than patches 7.19 and 7.20, which are the new standard for online matches during the September - November period. The most notable difference being the stronger Ardent Censer support meta with patch 7.18.

A total of 24 teams participated in the tournament: 3 teams from South Korea, China, North America, Europe and Taiwan/Hong Kong/Macau; 1 team from Brazil, Latin America North, Latin America South, Japan, Oceania, Turkey, Southeast Asia and CIS/Russia; and 1 team from the Wildcard region with the highest rank finish at the 2017 Mid-Season Invitational (GPL in Southeast Asia, due to Gigabyte Marines from Vietnam prevailing there, and Vietnam received 1 more slot for VCS's second seed to participate GPL 2017 summer split).

Samsung Galaxy reversed the previous year's result and defeated SK Telecom T1 3–0 in the 2017 World Championship final. Park "Ruler" Jae-hyuk, the AD carry of Samsung, was named MVP. The final was watched by 60 million people, breaking 2016's final's viewer records. The tournament is widely praised for its high quality of plays and amazing ceremonial performances, while receiving worldwide attention for its dramatic and emotional series. It is currently the most watched tournament in League of Legends history, and is lauded as one of the best.

 2018 

The 2018 World Championship was held from 1 October to 3 November 2018, in 4 cities across South Korea: Seoul (play-in), Busan (groups & quarterfinals), Gwangju (semifinals), and Incheon (final). Twenty four teams qualified for the tournament based on their placement in regional circuits such as those in North America, Europe, South Korea, and China, with twelve of those teams having to reach the group stage via a play-in round.

The 2018 World Championship was played on Patch 8.19. Notably, champions Aatrox, Alistar and Urgot were extremely prevalent in the tournament, with the three characters being picked or banned in over 90 percent of the 78 games played. The World Championship final was played between Invictus Gaming and Fnatic. Invictus Gaming won 3–0 against Fnatic, granting China and the LPL their first World Championship. Gao "Ning" Zhenning was named the MVP of the series in their victory. The final was watched by 99.6 million unique viewers, with concurrent viewership reaching a peak of 44 million viewers, breaking 2017's final's viewership record.

 2019 
The 2019 World Championship was held between 2 October to 10 November 2019, in three countries and cities in Europe: Berlin (play-in & groups), Madrid (quarterfinals and semifinals), and Paris (final). Twenty-four teams qualified to participate at the World Championship based on placement within their own regional leagues and previous regional results in international play.

The 2019 World Championship was played on Patch 9.19 from start to finish. The World Championship final was played on 10 November 2019 between LPL's FunPlus Phoenix and LEC's G2 Esports at AccorHotels Arena in Paris. FunPlus Phoenix won 3–0 against G2 Esports, granting China and the LPL back-to-back World Championships. Gao "Tian" Tianliang was named the MVP of the series in their victory. The final was watched by more than 100 million viewers, peaking at 44 million concurrent views.

 2020 
The 2020 World Championship was held from 25 September to 31 October 2020 in Shanghai, China. 22 teams qualified to participate at the World Championship based on placement within their own regional leagues and previous regional results in international play. As a result of travel restrictions related to the COVID-19 pandemic, the two teams that qualified from the Vietnam Championship Series were unable to attend the event.

All games leading up to the final were hosted in the Shanghai Media Tech Studio with no fans in attendance. The final was hosted in the Pudong Football Stadium as the building's inaugural event, hosting a limited number of 6,312 fans due to the COVID-19 pandemic. The final was played on 31 October 2020 between Suning, from China's League of Legends Pro League, and Damwon Gaming, from League of Legends Champions Korea, with Damwon Gaming winning the championship 3–1. During the second game, Suning's top laner Chen "Bin" Zebin achieved the first "Pentakill" in the final of a World Championship. Damwon Gaming's jungler, Kim "Canyon" Geon-bu, was named the MVP of the series. Damwon's win ended the LPL's back-to-back streak of world championship victories.   The final was watched at its peak by 46.07 million viewers.

 2021 

The 2021 World Championship was held from 5 October to 6 November 2021 in Reykjavík, Iceland. In line with last year's iteration, 22 teams qualified to participate at the World Championship based on placement within their own regional leagues and previous regional results in international play. As a result of travel restrictions related to the COVID-19 pandemic, the two teams that qualified from the Vietnam Championship Series were once again unable to attend the event.

All games of the tournament were hosted in the Laugardalshöll, with no fans in attendance due to the COVID-19 pandemic in Iceland. The final was played on 6 November 2021 between Edward Gaming, from China's League of Legends Pro League, and defending champions DWG KIA (formerly Damwon Gaming), from League of Legends Champions Korea, with Edward Gaming winning the championship 3–2, ending DWG KIA's chance to win back-to-back world championships. Edward Gaming's mid laner, Lee "Scout" Ye-chan, was named the MVP of the series. The final had an average audience of 30.6 million, peaking at 73.86 million concurrent viewers.

 2022 

The 2022 World Championship was held from 29 September to 5 November 2022, with the event taking place in 4 cities across North America: Mexico City (play-in), New York City (groups & quarterfinals), Atlanta (semifinals) and San Francisco (finals). Twenty-four teams qualified to participate at the World Championship based on placement within their own regional leagues and previous regional results in international play. As a result of the 2022 Russian invasion of Ukraine, the League of Legends Continental League from the CIS region was unable to send a representative to participate in the event.

The finals was played at the Chase Center on 5 November 2022 between T1 and DRX, both from the League of Legends Champions Korea (LCK). In the final, DRX defeated T1 3–2 in a close series, becoming the first team to win the championship after starting from the play-in stage. DRX's top laner, Hwang "Kingen" Seong-hoon, was named the MVP of the series. Their victory was considered a Cinderella and underdog success story, as they had come from the play-in stage as Korea's fourth seed representative, and had beaten some of the more favored and accomplished teams along the way, including the previous worlds champions Edward Gaming in a 3–2 reverse sweep in the quarterfinals, and defeating the LCK Summer Split champions Gen.G 3–1 in the semifinals.

 2023 
The first-ever Worlds Qualifying Series tournament will feature teams that place 4th in the LEC and LCS in a split ahead of the Worlds. The winner of the bo5 match will travel to Korea, where he will join the 21 teams who qualified for the main tournament of the year by a different route.
The 2023 season will be a test season for the Worlds Qualifying Series. In the future, Riot plans to expand the list of WQC participants with teams from other regions.

 Trophy 

Riot Games, which owns League of Legends'', commissioned the winner's trophy as the Summoner's Cup. Riot specified that it should weigh 70 pounds (about 32 kilograms), though the actual weight of the finished cup was reduced so it would not be too heavy to lift in victory.
The World Championship Cups for 2012 and for 2014 were created by Thomas Lyte.

In 2022, Riot Games announced the formation of a multi-year partnership with American jewelry brand Tiffany & Co., producing a newly designed Summoner's Cup with a weight of 44 pounds (about 20 kilograms).

Results

Year-by-year

Regions which have reached the top four 
(*): The region had two teams that finished in 3rd–4th place that year.

Teams which have reached the top four 
 Background shading indicates a team/organization has been disbanded, acquired or no longer participates in the regional league.

Notes

References 

 
League of Legends competitions
World championships in esports
Recurring sporting events established in 2011
League
2011 multiplayer online battle arena tournaments